Zurab Dzhidzhishvili (born 23 September 1973) is a Georgian alpine skier. He competed at the 1994 Winter Olympics and the 1998 Winter Olympics. In 1996 and 1997, he appeared at the world alpine skiing championships. At the Sierra Nevada championships he was 32nd in the slalom giant and 62nd in the downhill and supergiant, while at the Sestriere championships he was 22nd in the combined, 35th in the slalom giant, 41st in the downhill and 54th in the supergiant.

References

External links
 

1973 births
Living people
Male alpine skiers from Georgia (country)
Olympic alpine skiers of Georgia (country)
Alpine skiers at the 1994 Winter Olympics
Alpine skiers at the 1998 Winter Olympics
People from Samtskhe–Javakheti